Safronovo is a rural locality (a selo) in Paklinsky Selsoviet, Bayevsky District, Altai Krai, Russia. The population was 246 as of 2013. There are 2 streets.

Geography 
Safronovo is located 45 km southeast of Bayevo (the district's administrative centre) by road. Paklino is the nearest rural locality.

References 

Rural localities in Bayevsky District